Aveo may refer to:

 Aveo Group, an Australian senior living company
 Chevrolet Aveo, a 2002–2020 American subcompact car
 Chevrolet Sail, a 2000–present Chinese-American subcompact car, sold in Central America as Chevrolet Aveo

See also
 Aveos Fleet Performance, a former Canadian aircraft component company